The Little Manistee River is a  tributary of the Manistee River in Michigan. It rises in the southeast corner of Ellsworth Township in Lake County and flows west-northwest to its mouth at the southeast end of Manistee Lake in Manistee County.

See also
List of rivers of Michigan

References

Michigan  Streamflow Data from the USGS

Rivers of Michigan
Rivers of Lake County, Michigan
Tributaries of Lake Michigan